Iowa Highway 191 (Iowa 191) is a highway in western Iowa. For its entire length, Iowa 191 closely parallels Mosquito Creek and a line of the BNSF Railway. Iowa 191 begins at Interstate 880 north of Neola and ends at Iowa Highway 37 in Earling. Previously, it began at U.S. Highway 6 in Council Bluffs until 1981, and the city limits of Council Bluffs until July 1, 2003. This old segment of highway ran through Underwood and Neola, and is now Pottawattamie County Road G8L.

Route description
Iowa Highway 191 begins at exit 28 of Interstate 880 (I-880) north of Neola in Pottawattamie County. Five miles north of the county line, Iowa 191 enters the small town of Persia. Through Persia, Iowa 191 is called Railway Street, because the highway runs parallel to a BNSF Railway line.

North of Persia, Iowa 191 enters Shelby County.  Three miles north of the county line, Iowa 191 intersects Iowa Highway 44 just south of Portsmouth.  North of Portsmouth, the highway enters Panama, which was originally known as Crandall's Station in the 1880s.  Southwest of Earling, Iowa 191 and Mosquito Creek part ways; up to this point Iowa 191 had paralleled the creek as well as the rail line.  It enters Earling on the southwest side of town and ends at an intersection with Iowa Highway 37 and Shelby County Road M16.

History
Iowa Highway 191 has lengthened and shortened a few times in its history.  Upon its designation in the 1930s, Primary Road No. 191 ran from Primary Road No. 64 in Neola to its current northern end in Earling.  When Iowa 64 was truncated to its route in eastern Iowa, Iowa 191 took over the route from Neola to Council Bluffs.  In 1981, Iowa 191 was pushed back to the city limits of Council Bluffs.  In 2002, the portion south of Interstate 680 (now I-880) was identified as a local service highway and was turned over to Pottawattamie County on July 1, 2003.

Major intersections

References

External links

191